Harry Gray may refer to:

Harry Gray (business) (1919–2009), American business executive
Harry B. Gray (born 1935), American chemist
Harry Gray (sculptor) (fl. c. 2000), British sculptor of Battle of Britain Memorial, Capel-le-Ferne
Harry Gray (hurler) (1915–1978), Irish hurler
Harry Gray (footballer) (1916–1989), Australian rules footballer

See also
Henry Gray (disambiguation)
Harry Grey (disambiguation)
Harold Gray (1894–1968), American newspaper artist and cartoonist
Harry De Gray (1866–1952), chairman of the Shanghai Municipal Council